Nymphicula torresalis is a moth in the family Crambidae. It was described by David John Lawrence Agassiz in 2014. It is found in Papua New Guinea and Australia, where it has been recorded from Queensland.

The wingspan is 12–13 mm. The base of the forewing is brown with a yellow subbasal fascia, edged with white. There is an antemedian line of dark fuscous scales and the median area is scaled with dark brown. The terminal area is yellow. The base of the hindwings is whitish.

Etymology
The species name refers to the Torres Straits.

References

Nymphicula
Moths described in 2014